The 2022 Fermanagh Senior Football Championship is the 116th edition of the Fermanagh GAA's premier club Gaelic football tournament for senior clubs in County Fermanagh, Northern Ireland. The tournament consists of eight teams. The championship consists of 8 teams and had a new group stage format. The championship began on 9 September 2022.

Derrygonnelly Harps were the defending champions, but were beaten by Enniskillen Gaels at the semi-final stage.

The final was due to be played on 23 October, but was postponed due to a waterlogged pitch. The final was played seven days later, and Enniskillen Gaels defeated Erne Gaels Belleek to win their first title since 2006.

Team changes
The following teams have changed division since the 2021 championship season.

To Championship
Promoted from 2021 Intermediate Championship
 Erne Gaels Belleek - (Intermediate Champions)

From Championship
Relegated to 2022 Intermediate Championship
 Tempo Maguires - (Relegation Play-off Losers)

Group stage

Group A

Group B

Knock-Out Stage

Quarter-finals

Semi-finals

Final

Relegation play-off

Relegation Final

References

Fermanagh Senior
Fermanagh
Fermanagh Senior Football Championship